Tom Jackson Jr. (born December 18, 1959) is president of California Polytechnic University Humboldt(CPH), where he started in fall 2019. He is best known for overseeing the plan to remove all on campus housing options for returning CPH students in the Fall 2023 semester.

He was previously president of Black Hills State University in Spearfish, South Dakota, vice president for student affairs at the University of Louisville in Louisville, Kentucky, and president of the American College Personnel Association (ACPA).

Early life and education
Jackson was born December 18, 1959 in Seattle, Washington. Jackson received his AA in general studies in 1982 from Highline College, his BS in business management/personnel in 1985 from Southwest State University, his MS in counseling/student personnel (CACREP) in 1987, and his EdD in educational management from the University of La Verne in 1995. Jackson attended Harvard University's Institute for Educational Management (IEM) in 2005.

Career
Jackson's career includes experience at colleges and universities throughout the United States including serving as President of the American College Personnel Association (ACPA).

Top priorities for Jackson in leadership positions have been internationalism, service to veterans, and expanding education opportunities.

Jackson was inducted as a faculty/staff member into Omicron Delta Kappa at the University of Louisville in 2008.

Jackson was named the top "Rising Accounts of Higher Education Presidents to Follow on Twitter" by higher education blogger Josie Alhquist.

Military service and community involvement
Jackson is a veteran and serves as a member of the Rapid City Economic Development Corporation, First Interstate Bank's Advisory Board, Spearfish Economic Development Corporation, Spearfish Chamber of Commerce, and as a Board Member of Lead365.

References

1959 births
Living people
Humboldt State University faculty
Black Hills State University
University of Louisville faculty
Shippensburg University of Pennsylvania alumni
University of La Verne alumni
People from Seattle